Port Hope Simpson Airport  is  south of Port Hope Simpson, Newfoundland and Labrador, Canada.

As of March 2017, Port Hope is not listed as a scheduled destination in the Air Labrador flight schedule.

References

External links

Certified airports in Newfoundland and Labrador